The Bolton Baronetcy, of West Plean in the County of Stirling, was a title in the Baronetage of the United Kingdom. It was created on 25 January 1927 for Edwin Bolton, Chairman of the Territorial Army Association. The second Baronet was Lord-Lieutenant of Stirlingshire. The title became extinct on his death in 1982.

Bolton baronets, of West Plean (1927)

Sir Edwin Bolton, MBE, 1st Baronet (1858–1931)
Sir Ian Frederick Cheney Bolton, KBE, 2nd Baronet (1889–1982)

The simple grave of the baronets stands on the middle north-west slopes of the Glasgow Necropolis.

References

Extinct baronetcies in the Baronetage of the United Kingdom